Stavento is a Greek Hip-Hop band from Alexandroupoli. Created in 2004 by Michalis Kouinellis, Kostas Lattas (Akritas) and Eva Kanata. 
Responsible for the production and the lyrics appear to be Michalis Kouinellis, nicknamed "ICU". Quickly became known because it introduced new elements into Greek hip hop scene, Juggling several times between hip hop, R&B and rock. Great success with the songs "Beautiful" and "how long".
Usually the single are collaborations with other artists outside of the band like "Before I meet" with Shaya and "As the day comes the" with Ivi Adamou. They have released three albums, most recently in "Once upon a time."

Discography

Albums
 To pio Glyko Methysi (2004)
 Grifos (2006)
 Simera to yortazo (2008)
 Mia fora ki enan kero (2010)
 Stin akri tou kosmou (2013)
 Akoma Onireuomai (2016)

Singles
To pio glyko methysi
Grifos
Mesa sou
Prin Se Gnoriso feat. Shaya
Simera to giortazo
Mesa sou feat. Helena Paparizou
Mia ginaika ola ta mpori
San Erthi I Mera feat. Ivi Adamou
Ama S'Iha Konta Mou
Hey Hop
Kano Ton Kosmo Anakato
Ston kosmo mas
Ola Kala Tha Pane
Tha Ta Katafero
Pidao Ta Kimata
Astrapsa Kai Vrontiksa
Na Sou Tragoudo feat. Ivi Adamou
Aspro Pato  feat Team STAVENTO(The voice of Greece 2015)

References

Greek hip hop groups